"Blurry" is a song by American rock band Puddle of Mudd. It was released on October 16, 2001, as the second single from the band's debut album Come Clean (2001). It was 2002's most successful rock song in the United States, topping the Billboard Mainstream Rock and Modern Rock Tracks charts as well as their year-end listings. "Blurry" also found success outside the US, reaching the top 20 in Ireland, New Zealand, and the United Kingdom.

Background

Puddle of Mudd played small shows in the Kansas City area for most of the 1990s with little mainstream success. However, singer Wes Scantlin got a demo tape to Limp Bizkit singer Fred Durst when Limp Bizkit were in town on the 1999 Family Values Tour, and Durst's label Flawless Records signed him to a recording contract. Unimpressed with Scantlin's bandmates, Flawless Records scrapped them all, rebuilt the group with musicians Scantlin had never seen before, and flew him out to Los Angeles in late 2000 to record with them. He spent his days fiddling with his acoustic guitar in a hotel room on Hollywood Boulevard, where he reworked a previous Puddle of Mudd song called "Electron Moon" into "Blurry".

“’Blurry’ was basically about being flown to freaking Los Angeles and y’know, I didn't have any friends so they had put me into a hotel room,” Scantlin told American Songwriter. “I didn't know anybody at all. And I was just missing my family and son, I missed my grandma and stuff.”

Composition
The song is written in the key of E minor with a moderately slow tempo of 78 beats per minute.  The song follows a chord progression of C–D–Em, and the vocals in the song span from D3 to A4.

Commercial performance
"Blurry" is Puddle of Mudd's most successful song, reaching the number-one spot on the Billboard Hot Mainstream Rock Tracks and Hot Modern Rock Tracks charts for 10 and nine weeks, respectively. This soon propelled the single to mainstream success, reaching the number five spot on both the Billboard Hot 100 Airplay and Billboard Hot 100 and number three on the Pop Songs chart. "Blurry" was the eight-most played song on radio in Canada in 2002. The song is also the band's highest selling U.S. single ever, with sales of 753,000 copies, as of 2010. Additionally, the song's writers, Wes Scantlin, Doug Ardito, and Jimmy Allen, won ASCAP (American Society of Composers, Authors and Publishers) Song of the Year and Pop Song of the Year for this tune. "Blurry" also won two Billboard Awards in 2002, for Modern Rock Track of the Year and Rock Track of the Year. It also received the Kerrang! Award for Best Single. "Blurry" reached number eight in the UK Singles Chart on its release there in June 2002, becoming the band's highest charting single in the United Kingdom.

Music video
The music video shows Scantlin playing with his son Jordan, interspersed with shots of the band playing in a garage. Towards the end of the video, a man and a woman (presumably Jordan's mother and stepfather) are shown driving away with Jordan in the back seat as Wes watches sadly. The video was directed by Limp Bizkit vocalist Fred Durst.

Accolades

Track listings

Australian CD single
 "Blurry" (radio edit)
 "Abrasive"
 "Nobody Told Me"

European CD single
 "Blurry" (album version)
 "All I Ask For"

UK cassette single
 "Blurry"
 "All I Ask For" (demo)

UK CD1
 "Blurry"
 "All I Ask For" (demo)
 "Out of My Head" (live)
 "Blurry" (video)

UK CD2
 "Blurry"
 "Control" (live)
 "Bring Me Down" (live)

Charts

Weekly charts

Year-end charts

Certifications

Release history

Uses in media
 This song was used as the title theme for the video game Ace Combat 5: The Unsung War.
 This song was used in the trailer for the 2003 film A Man Apart.
 On June 21, 2011, this song was released as downloadable content for the rhythm game Rock Band 3.
 The song was used in the American television show The Secret Life of the American Teenager in the series finale.

Covers
 P.M. Dawn appeared on NBC's Hit Me, Baby, One More Time, performing "Set Adrift on Memory Bliss", and covered Puddle of Mudd's "Blurry". Despite the fact that Prince Be was still suffering the effects of this stroke, they beat Animotion, Missing Persons, Juice Newton and Shannon to claim the $20,000 charitable prize, which they contributed to the Juvenile Diabetes Research Foundation, as Prince Be was a diabetic.  In June 2019, P.M. Dawn collaborated with musician Tommy Marz on a studio version of Blurry dedicated to the memory of Attrell Cordes
 On May 21, 2021, country rock singer-songwriter Hardy released a cover of "Blurry" with an accompanying music video on YouTube.

References

External links
 

Puddle of Mudd songs
2001 singles
2002 singles
Geffen Records singles
Music videos directed by Fred Durst
Rock ballads
2000s ballads
2001 songs
Songs about parenthood
Songs written by Wes Scantlin
Songs written by Doug Ardito
Songs written by Jimmy Allen (musician)